Spyridon (secular name: Σπυρίδων Βλάχος Spyridon Vlachos) was Archbishop of Athens and All Greece from 1949 until 1956. He was born in Chili (Χήλη), in present-day northern Turkey, and studied at the Halki seminary. As a senior preacher in Kavala, he offered moral and material support to the Struggle for Macedonia, and in 1906, he was elected Metropolitan Bishop of Vella and Konitsa. His services during the Balkan Wars and on the matter of Northern Epirus were significant. In the Vella Monastery, he founded a seminary based on a primary school.

In 1916, he was elected Metropolitan of Ioannina and in 1949 was elected Archbishop of Athens and All Greece. He worked to reorganize the church after the Second World War and the Greek Civil War.

In 1950 he led the call in Greece for enosis, the union of Cyprus with Greece. He actively participated in the war in Cyprus, and was succeeded by Makarios, later Archbishop of Cyprus.

He died in 1956 and was succeeded by Archbishop Dorotheus.

References

19th-century births
1956 deaths
Archbishops of Athens and All Greece
20th-century Eastern Orthodox archbishops
Date of death missing
Theological School of Halki alumni
Bishops of Ioannina
Northern Epirus independence activists
Greeks from the Ottoman Empire
19th-century people from the Ottoman Empire
People from Şile